is a Japanese professional baseball player. He is a pitcher for the Tohoku Rakuten Golden Eagles of Nippon Professional Baseball (NPB).

References 

1994 births
Living people
Baseball people from Shiga Prefecture
Nippon Professional Baseball pitchers
Tohoku Rakuten Golden Eagles players